Daniel Juncadella Pérez-Sala (born 7 May 1991) is a Spanish racing driver who currently competes in the Deutsche Tourenwagen Masters. He is son of Xavier Juncadella and nephew of José María Juncadella, Alex Soler-Roig and Luis Pérez-Sala, also racecar drivers.

Career

Karting 
Juncadella began his motorsport career in karting in 2004, finishing 21st in the Copa Campeones Trophy Junior. He also finished 32nd in the Andrea Margutti Trophy ICA Junior class.

Master Junior Formula 
Juncadella began his formula racing career in the 2007 Master Junior Formula season. He finished as runner-up in the championship, with seven wins and 359 points; losing out to Isaac Lopez by nine points.

Formula BMW 
After six races at the end of the 2007 Formula BMW ADAC season, the following season, Juncadella competed in the new-for-2008 Formula BMW Europe series for EuroInternational. He finished fourth in the standings, taking thirteen points-scoring positions in sixteen races, including two wins at the Hungaroring. For 2009, Juncadella remained in the series, staying with EuroInternational. He finished as runner-up behind Brazilian team-mate Felipe Nasr in the championship with one win at Autodromo Nazionale Monza. Juncadella finished every race in the points, but was not enough to keep his backing from the Red Bull Junior Team.

Formula Three 

Juncadella has stepped up to the Formula 3 Euro Series for the 2010 season, joining Nicolas Marroc at Prema Powerteam, supported by professional road bicycle racing team Astana. At his first event at Circuit Paul Ricard, Juncadella took his first pole position before finishing fourth in the first race.

DTM 
For the 2013 season, Juncadella raced with Mercedes in the DTM. His best result in the series is a victory at the first race of the 2018 Brands Hatch Weekend.

Formula One 
He tested with Williams F1 during the Young Drivers test at Silverstone, setting the fifth best time on the first day.

On 24 January 2014, Juncadella joined Force India as a reserve driver. He attended all races and took part in Friday practice sessions.

Personal life 
Juncadella list his hobbies as cross-country skiing, padel tennis, golf, music, going out, while his favourite circuit is Autodromo Nazionale Monza, where he won once during the 2009 Formula BMW Europe season. His favorite drivers are Mika Häkkinen and Michael Schumacher.

Racing record

Career summary 

† As Juncadella was a guest driver, he was ineligible for points.
* Season still in progress.

Complete Formula 3 Euro Series results 
(key)

Complete GP3 Series results 
(key) (Races in bold indicate pole position) (Races in italics indicate fastest lap)

Complete Deutsche Tourenwagen Masters results 
(key) (Races in bold indicate pole position) (Races in italics indicate fastest lap)

† Driver did not finish, but was classified as he completed 75% of the winner's race distance.

Complete Formula One participations 
(key) (Races in bold indicate pole position) (Races in italics indicates fastest lap)

Complete Blancpain GT Series Sprint Cup results

Complete IMSA SportsCar Championship results
(key) (Races in bold indicate pole position; races in italics indicate fastest lap)

* Season still in progress.

References

External links 

  
 

1991 births
Living people
Racing drivers from Barcelona
Spanish racing drivers
Formula BMW ADAC drivers
Formula BMW USA drivers
Formula BMW Europe drivers
Formula 3 Euro Series drivers
British Formula Three Championship drivers
Formula 3 Euro Series champions
FIA Formula 3 European Championship drivers
Spanish GP3 Series drivers
Deutsche Tourenwagen Masters drivers
Blancpain Endurance Series drivers
24 Hours of Spa drivers
24 Hours of Daytona drivers
Prema Powerteam drivers
British GT Championship drivers
WeatherTech SportsCar Championship drivers
Nürburgring 24 Hours drivers
Euroformula Open Championship drivers
Fortec Motorsport drivers
HWA Team drivers
Mercedes-AMG Motorsport drivers
Hitech Grand Prix drivers
Tech 1 Racing drivers
EuroInternational drivers
R-Motorsport drivers
Jota Sport drivers
Rowe Racing drivers
Mücke Motorsport drivers
Aston Martin Racing drivers
De Villota Motorsport drivers
FIA Motorsport Games drivers
Craft-Bamboo Racing drivers